Isaac Penington (c. 1584 – 16 December 1661) was an English politician who sat in the House of Commons from 1640 to 1653. He was Lord Mayor of London in 1642 and a prominent member of Oliver Cromwell's government.

Biography
Penington was the son of Robert Penington and followed him in becoming a Liveryman of the Worshipful Company of Fishmongers. He inherited several estates from his father and purchased one of his own. He made a fortune as a wine and cloth merchant. From 1626 he acted as financial agent to his second cousin, Admiral John Penington. He increased his commercial holdings in 1629 by becoming a partner in the brewery business of his second wife's family. He and his wife, Mary, the widow of Roger Wilkinson, a Citizen of the City of London,  were both staunch Puritans.

In 1638 Penington was elected Sheriff of London and became an alderman of the City of London for Bridge Without ward on 29 January 1639. He was Prime Warden of the Fishmongers Company in 1640.

In April 1640 Penington was elected a Member of Parliament (MP) for the City of London in the Short Parliament. He was re-elected MP for City of London for the Long Parliament in November 1640 and sat until 1653.  On 16 August 1642 Parliament appointed him Lord Mayor of London after removing the Royalist Sir Richard Gurney, 1st Baronet from the position. He became Colonel of the White Regiment, London Trained Bands, in 1642 and from 1642 to 1645 he was Lieutenant of the Tower of London. In that capacity he was present during the execution of William Laud. He became Governor of the Levant Company in 1644, retaining the position to 1654.

In January 1649, Penington was appointed a commissioner of the High Court of Justice at the trial of King Charles, but he was not one of the signatories of the King's death warrant.  He served on the Rump's Council of State and on several government committees. He was made a knight in 1649. From 1650 he was the sole representative of the City of London in the Rump Parliament until it was forcibly ejected by Oliver Cromwell on 30 April 1653.

After the Restoration, he was tried for high treason and imprisoned in the Tower of London, where he died on the night of 16 December 1661.

Marriage and children
Penington married twice:
Firstly, in 1614–15, to Abigail Allen, a daughter of John Allen of the City of London, by whom he had six children:
Isaac Penington, the Quaker; 
Arthur Penington, who became a Roman Catholic priest, and was living in 1676; 
William Penington (1622–1689), a merchant of London, who also became a quaker and follower of John Perrot;
Abigail Penington (married about November 1641);
Bridget Penington;
Judith Penington. An acquaintance of Samuel Pepys. Letters from Isaac Penington the younger to his sister Judith imply that she also became a quaker. 
Secondly he married Mary Young, a daughter of Matthew Young, and widow of Roger Wilkinson, a Citizen of the City of London.

See also
List of Lord Mayors of London
List of Sheriffs of London

Notes

References

 Keith Roberts, London And Liberty: Ensigns of the London Trained Bands, Eastwood, Nottinghamshire: Partizan Press, 1987, .

 British Civil War Project

Further reading
 cites 

1580s births
1661 deaths
Year of birth uncertain
Members of the Parliament of England for the City of London
Regicides of Charles I
Sheriffs of the City of London
17th-century lord mayors of London
Lieutenants of the Tower of London
London Trained Bands officers
English MPs 1640 (April)
English MPs 1640–1648
English MPs 1648–1653
Levant Company
People convicted of treason against England
Prisoners in the Tower of London